Mary Fell (born September 22, 1947 Worcester, Massachusetts) is an American poet and academic.

Life
She graduated from Worcester State College majoring in English and it was here that she first became interested in poetry. Fell and fellow poet Fran Quinn toured local schools teaching poetry, starting in 1975. She earned her MFA in 1981 and received the Indiana University Award for Distinguished Teaching in 2001. She is Professor Emerita of English at Indiana University East in Richmond, Indiana and continues with her writing.

Awards
 1983 National Poetry Series, for The Persistence of Memory

Work
 
  (chapbook)

References

External links
 Biography, Works and Photos at the Worcester Writers' Project
 "An Essay about Triangle Fire Poetry", Modern American Poery, Janet Zandy

Living people
1947 births
American women poets
Worcester State University alumni
Indiana University faculty
Writers from Worcester, Massachusetts
American women academics